George Harold Shepstone (9 April 1876 – 3 July 1940) was a South African cricketer who played in two Test matches in 1896 and 1899.

External links

1876 births
1940 deaths
South Africa Test cricketers
South African cricketers
Gauteng cricketers
Alumni of Maritzburg College
Marylebone Cricket Club cricketers